The 1966 World Amateur Snooker Championship was the second edition of the championship that later became known as the IBSF World Snooker Championship, following the first staging in 1963. It was played in Karachi, Pakistan as a round-robin. Five players participated. Gary Owen won all four of his matches and took the title, with John Spencer finishing in second place. Owen compiled the highest  of the event, 118. Barrie had set a new championship record break of 76 against Demarco. Owen surpassed it with a break of 106, also against Demarco, before making the 118 break in his match against Lafir.

Final standings

Match results

References

Snooker amateur tournaments
International sports competitions hosted by Pakistan
1966 in snooker